Michael B. Carroll (born 1962) is an American politician. A Democrat, he served as a member of the Pennsylvania House of Representatives for the 118th District from 2007 to 2023. On January 12, 2023, Governor-elect Josh Shapiro nominated Carroll to serve as Pennsylvania Secretary of Transportation.

Early life and education 
Carroll was born in Avoca, Pennsylvania. He graduated from Pittston Area High School in 1980 and received a Bachelor of Arts in liberal studies from the University of Scranton.

Career 
Prior to elective office, he worked as district office director for Congressman Paul Kanjorski, as liaison for transportation issues for Governor Bob Casey, and as chief of staff for Representative John Yudichak. He was elected to the Pennsylvania House of Representatives in November 2006 and assumed office on January 2, 2007. He did not seek re-election in 2022.

References

External links
 Pennsylvania House of Representatives - Michael B. Carroll's official PA House website 
 Pennsylvania House Democratic Caucus - Michael B. Carroll's official caucus website 

Living people
1962 births
People from Luzerne County, Pennsylvania
Democratic Party members of the Pennsylvania House of Representatives
University of Scranton alumni
21st-century American politicians